Meera - Krishna Se Laagi Aisi Lagan Ek Rajkuvri Bani Jogan is an Indian historical drama television series produced by Sagar Pictures and written by Vipul Mehta. It is based on the life of Meera Bai, a 15th-century Hindu mystic and poet whose lyrical songs of devotion to the god Krishna are widely popular in northern India. The series, aired on NDTV Imagine from 27 July 2009 till 29  January 2010.

Synopsis
Meera, the great poet saint was born a princess in Khudki in Rajasthan in the early 16th century. Her father was Ratan Singh — the youngest son of Rao Dooda, the then ruler of Merta a small state in Marwar. From the time of her birth, it was predicted by Raidasji (a great saint) that Meera was meant for greater things and that her family would be known in through the decades because of her achievements.

When Meera is about 8–9 years old she wants a Gudda (doll) whom she can marry. Saint Raidas-ji gives her Lord Krishna's idol, and Meera immediately falls in love with the Lord. Meera truly believes that the Lord is her husband.

Soon after, her marriage is fixed with Bhoj Raj, the son of Rana Sangha of Chittor. But Meera remained, in mind, heart and soul, married to the Lord and never accepted the prince as her husband. After marriage her life was constantly engulfed in turmoil, as very few could understand her devotion and faith towards Lord Krishna. She was soft-spoken, mild-mannered, gifted, sweet and sang with a melodious voice. She was one of the foremost exponents of the Prema Bhakti (Divine Love) and an inspired poet.

Soon Meera starts to care for Bhoj Raj but is rigid to accept him as her husband; he dies fighting in a war. After which soon Rana Sangha too dies while fighting. Thus Vikramaditya is made the new Rana (king). He desperately starts having feelings for Meera, who is somehow every time saved by her mother-in-law. She soon leaves Chittod, with a heavy heart with Lalita. She gives her Krishna idol to her mother-in-law, saying that the idol had her life since childhood. But, as fate had she returns to Merta just to know that her brother, Jaimall has died. After spending some years there she goes on pilgrimage to Dwarka and Vrindavan. She disappears within the Lord's idol, making to know that she has attained Moksha and has reached her lord, after years of service. Lalita too gives up her life by jumping into the sea, as "wherever there is Meera, there is Lalita".

Through this show, the attempt to portray Meera's story is as that of an ordinary Rajput princess whose ultimate love and devotion to the Lord led her to question the set norms of the patriarchal society. It is a story relevant even in today's day and age as Meera embodies a woman's true love and her ultimate sacrifice to remain loyal to that love even in the face of social stigma and opposition. A story of unquestioning and pure love.

Cast
 Aditi Sajwan as Meera 
 Aashika Bhatia as young Meera
 Gauri Singh as Veer Kunwari: Meera's mother and Ratan Singh's wife.
 Kunal Bakshi as Ratan Singh: Meera's father.
 Paras Arora as Jaimall: Meera's cousin brother.
Shreya Laheri as Lalita: Meera's best friend since childhood.
Twara Desai as Lalita: Desai replaced Laheri 
 Ravi Jhankal as Rao Doodaji: Meera's grandfather.
Abhilin Pandey as Bhojraj: Meera's husband
 Zeb Khan as Vikramaditya: Bhojraj's half brother
Arvind Rao Suriya as Saint Raidas as Meera's spiritual Guru.
 Prachee Pathak as Rani Karnavati: Bhojraj's mother and Meera's mother-in-law 
 Raza Murad as Rana Sanga:  Bhojraj and Vikramaditya's father

References

External links 
 Meera Official Site

2009 Indian television series debuts
2010 Indian television series endings
Indian period television series
Indian historical television series
Imagine TV original programming
Television shows set in Rajasthan
Television series set in the 16th century